This is a list of notable industrial engineers, people who were trained in or practiced industrial engineering who have established prominence in their profession.

A 
 Bud Adams – oil tycoon and owner of the Tennessee Titans.
 Ravindra K. Ahuja – editor of journals Operations Research, Transportation Science, and Networks
 Horace Lucian Arnold – American engineer, inventor, engineering journalist, and early writer on management

B 
 Ali Babacan – State Minister for Economy of Republic of Turkey (Middle East Technical University)
 Carl Georg Barth – Norwegian-American mathematician and mechanical engineer who improved and popularized the industrial use of compound slide rules
 Leslie Benmark – known for work in engineering education, specifically accreditation

C 
 Alexander Hamilton Church – English efficiency engineer, accountant and early writer on accountancy and management
 Richard W. Conway – Emerson Electric Company Professor of Manufacturing Management, Emeritus, at Cornell University
 Timothy D. Cook – Chief Executive Officer of Apple Inc. (Auburn University) aug 2011
 Roger Corman – American film producer and director (Stanford University)
 Nancy Currie – astronaut

D 
 John Dasburg – former CEO of Northwest Airlines and Burger King (University of Florida)
 John Z. DeLorean – former General Motors executive; founder of DeLorean Motors
 W. Edwards Deming – forerunner of Total Quality Management (TQC)
 Mike Duke – President and CEO of Wal-Mart Stores USA (Georgia Institute of Technology)

E 
 Harrington Emerson – American efficiency engineer and early management theorist
 A. K. Erlang – communications, queueing (University of Copenhagen)
 Michael Eskew – CEO of United Parcel Service (Purdue University)

F
 Adel Fakeih – Saudi Arabian politician
 Giacomo Ferrari – Italian politician and mayor of Parma
 Henry Ford – founder of the Ford Motor Company; revolutionized industrial production by being the first to apply assembly line manufacturing to a production process
 Joe Forehand – Chairman of the board and former CEO of Accenture (Auburn University)

G 
 Henry Gantt – inventor of the Gantt chart
Frank Gilbreth – time and motion studies
 Lillian Gilbreth – time and motion studies (University of California, Berkeley)
 Samuel Ginn – wireless communications pioneer; former chairman of Vodafone (Auburn University)
 Joe Girardi – manager, Florida Marlins and New York Yankees (Northwestern University)
 Eliyahu M. Goldratt – inventor of the theory of constraints

H 
 Joe Hardy – founder and CEO of 84 Lumber (University of Pittsburgh)
 Homer Hickam – NASA engineer; author of The Coalwood Way, Rocket Boys, October Sky, Torpedo Junction and Back to the Moon (Virginia Tech)
 Charles O. Holliday – CEO of DuPont (University of Tennessee)
 Linda Hudson – President and CEO of BAE Systems Inc. (University of Florida)

I 
 Lee Iacocca – former CEO of Chrysler (Lehigh University)

K 
 Shahid Khan – owner of automotive parts manufacturer Flex-N-Gate and the Jacksonville Jaguars 
 Charles Edward Knoeppel – American organizational theorist, consultant, and early management author
 Dick Kovacevich – CEO of Wells Fargo

L 
 Lars Lallerstedt – pioneer of Swedish industrial design.
 Tom Landry – former Dallas Cowboys Coach (University of Houston).
 Manny Lawson – active Buffalo Bills player (North Carolina State University).
 J. Slater Lewis – British engineer, inventor, business manager, and early author on management and accounting.

M
 William L. Maxwell – Andrew Schultz Jr. Emeritus Professor of Industrial Engineering at Cornell University
 Lydia Meredith – CEO of the Renaissance Learning Center
 Francesco Merloni – Italian industrialist and politician 
 Captain Henry Metcalfe – American Army ordnance officer, inventor and early organizational theorist
 Edwin Moses – world record hurdler
 John Muir – founder of Sierra Club
 Alphonse Munchen – Luxembourgian engineer and Mayor of Luxembourg City
 Richard Muther – consultant; author of several influential books on plant layout and material handling

N 
 Shimon Y. Nof – Professor of Industrial Engineering at Purdue University; creator and Head of the PRISM (Production and Robotics Software for Manufacturing and Management) lab

O 
 Taiichi Ohno – "father of the Toyota Production System", also known as Just In Time

P 
 R.K. Pachauri – Chairman of the Intergovernmental Panel on Climate Change and Director, Tata Energy Research Institute
 Oscar E. Perrigo – American mechanical engineer, inventor, and early technical and management author
 Guy Primus – COO of Overbrook Entertainment (Georgia Institute of Technology)
 A. Alan Pritsker – industrial engineer and teacher, pioneer of computer simulation languages (Purdue University)
 Paolo Lavadia – industrial engineer  (SLSUniversity)

Q 
 Jorge Quiroga – former president of Bolivia (Texas A&M University)

R 
 Jacob Rubinovitz – developer of instructional computer-integrated manufacturing and the robotics lab at the Faculty of Industrial Engineering and Management of the Technion

S 
 Shigeo Shingo – creator of SMED (Single Minute Exchange of Die) technique and Poka-Yoke (fail-safe) devices
 William H. Swanson – President and CEO of Raytheon Co. (California Polytechnic State University, San Luis Obispo)

T 
 Frederick Winslow Taylor – leader of the Efficiency Movement and a champion of standardisation and division of tasks
 Henry R. Towne – American mechanical engineer and businessman, known as an early systematizer of management
 John Tregoning (1840s–1920s) – American mechanical engineer; wrote the first books on factory management
Laura Tremosa – first Catalan woman to qualify as an industrial engineer

W 
 Edward Whitacre, Jr. – Chairman of General Motors; former Chairman and CEO of AT&T Inc. (Texas Tech University)
 Clinton Edgar Woods – American electrical and mechanical engineer, inventor, manufacturer of automobiles, and early management

See also 
 Institute of Industrial and Systems Engineers

References 

Lists of engineers

engineers